Kaitlyn Christian and Sabrina Santamaria were the defending champions, but both players chose not to participate.

Olga Govortsova and Valeria Savinykh won the title, defeating Cori Gauff and Ann Li in the final, 6–4, 6–0.

Seeds

Draw

References

External Links
Main Draw

Dow Tennis Classic - Doubles